Benn Steil is an American economist and writer. He was educated at Nuffield College, Oxford and at the Wharton School of the University of Pennsylvania. Steil is the senior fellow and director of international economics at the Council on Foreign Relations. He is the founder and editor of the journal International Finance. He has been awarded the New-York Historical Society’s Prize for best book on American history, the American Academy of Diplomacy’s Douglas Dillon Book Prize, the Hayek Book Prize, and the Spear’s Book Prize in Financial History..

Career

Benn Steil is senior fellow and director of international economics, as well as the official historian in residence, at the Council on Foreign Relations in New York.  He is also the founding editor of International Finance, a scholarly economics journal; lead writer of the Council’s Geo-Graphics economics blog; and creator of six web-based interactives tracking Global Monetary Policy, Global Imbalances, Sovereign Risk, Central Bank Currency Swaps, China’s Belt and Road Initiative, and Global Growth.  Prior to his joining the Council in 1999, he was director of the International Economics Programme at the Royal Institute of International Affairs in London.  He came to the Institute in 1992 from a Lloyd’s of London Tercentenary Research Fellowship at Nuffield College, Oxford, where he received his MPhil and DPhil (PhD) in economics.  He also holds a BSc in economics summa cum laude from the Wharton School of the University of Pennsylvania.

Dr. Steil has written and spoken widely on international finance, monetary policy, financial markets, and economic and diplomatic history. He has testified before the U.S. House, Senate, and CFTC, and is a regular op-ed writer and commentator on CNBC.  His most recent book, The Marshall Plan: Dawn of the Cold War, won the New-York Historical Society’s 2019 Barbara and David Zalaznick Prize for best work on American history, won the American Academy of Diplomacy’s 2018 Douglas Dillon Prize, won the Honorable Mention (runner-up) for the 2019 ASEEES Marshall D. Shulman Prize, was shortlisted for the Duff Cooper Prize, and is ranked number 3 among BookAuthority’s Best Diplomacy Books of All Time.  Paul Kennedy in the Wall Street Journal called the book “brilliant,” the New York Times called it “trenchant and timely,” the Financial Times called it “elegant in style and impressive in insights,” and the Christian Science Monitor called it a “gripping, complex, and critically important story that is told with clarity and precision.” His previous book, The Battle of Bretton Woods: John Maynard Keynes, Harry Dexter White, and the Making of a New World Order, won the 2013 Spear’s Book Award in Financial History, took third prize in CFR’s 2014 Arthur Ross Book Award competition, was shortlisted for the 2014 Lionel Gelber Prize (“the world’s most important prize for non-fiction,” according to The Economist), and was the top book-of-the-year choice in Bloomberg’s 2013 poll of global policymakers and CEOs.  The Financial Times called the book “a triumph of economic and diplomatic history,” the Wall Street Journal called it “a superb history,” the New York Times called it “the gold standard on its subject,” and Bloomberg’s Tom Keene called it “the publishing event of the season.” An earlier book, Money, Markets, and Sovereignty, won the 2010 Hayek Book Prize.

Awards and honors
 2018 - American Academy of Diplomacy’s Douglas Dillon Prize, winner for The Marshall Plan.
2018 - Barbara and David Zalaznick Book Prize in American History, winner for The Marshall Plan.
2013 - Spear's Book Prize in Financial History, winner for The Battle of Bretton Woods.
2010 - Hayek Book Prize, winner for Money, Markets, and Sovereignty.

Works
The Marshall Plan: Dawn of the Cold War (2018) 
The Battle of Bretton Woods: John Maynard Keynes, Harry Dexter White, and the Making of a New World Order (2013)
Money, Markets and Sovereignty (2009, with Manuel Hinds)
Financial Statecraft: The Role of Financial Markets in American Foreign Policy (2006, with Robert E. Litan)

References

External links

Year of birth missing (living people)
Living people
Wharton School of the University of Pennsylvania alumni
Alumni of Nuffield College, Oxford
American economics writers
21st-century  American  economists